Kozlovsky is a rural locality (a settlement) and the administrative center of Dobrinskoye Rural Settlement, Talovsky District, Voronezh Oblast, Russia. The population was 318 as of 2010. There are 3 streets.

References 

Rural localities in Talovsky District